CBC News: Morning was a Canadian breakfast television show which aired live on CBC Television from 6-7 a.m. ET (3-4 a.m. PT) and CBC Newsworld from 6-10 a.m. ET (3-7 a.m. PT). It was not available over-the-air in the Atlantic and Newfoundland Time Zones. The show was hosted by Heather Hiscox along with Colleen Jones who presented weather and sports news, Harry Forestell with international news and Danielle Bochove with business news.

The program was absorbed into CBC News Now when CBC Newsworld was re-branded itself as CBC News Network in October 2009. Hiscox continues to host from 6-9 a.m., and CBC Television continues to simulcast the 6:00 a.m. (local) hour in regions west of Atlantic Canada.

Other regular cast 
 Paul Wells, Maclean's magazine, political commentator
 Kady O'Malley, The Hill Times, political commentator
 Dr. Michael Evans, health news
 Bob McDonald, science news
 Jelena Adzic, arts and entertainment news

See also
 Rival morning programs included:
 Canada AM (CTV)
 Global Morning News (Global)
 Breakfast Television (Citytv)

External links
 

Television morning shows in Canada
Television shows filmed in Toronto
CBC Television original programming
CBC News Network original programming
CBC News
1990s Canadian television news shows
2000s Canadian television news shows